Aşağı Salahlı is a village and municipality in the Qazax District of Azerbaijan.  It has a population of 1,624.

References 

Populated places in Qazax District